Silver Summit may refer to:

Places

In Canada
Silver Summit, Alberta, a ski area in Yellowhead County

In the United States
Silver Summit, Utah, a census-designated place in Summit County